The Ministry of National Guard Health Affairs (MNG-HA) is a government-funded health system in the Kingdom of Saudi Arabia, founded in 1983. It is affiliated with the Ministry of National Guard and the Saudi Arabian National Guard, consisting of medical cities spread in many regions (Riyadh, Jeddah, Al-Ahsa, Dammam, and Medina).

Facilities

King Abdulaziz Medical City in Riyadh 

King Abdulaziz Medical City provides all types of care to all National Guard soldiers and their families, starting from primary health care up to tertiary specialized care. In 2012, It became a recognized center on the international level in conjoined twin separation surgery. It was the first center to have a 100% successful twin separation surgery rate.

King Abdulaziz Medical City in Jeddah 
It is located in the city of Jeddah, and it consists of several hospitals and specialized medical centers, and its clinical capacity is 751 beds. It provides medical care services at the latest level to Saudi citizens in the Western Region. It was known as King Khalid National Guard Hospital when it opened, and after adding several expansions, developmental medical projects and specialized centers, it changed its name to King Abdulaziz Medical City.

Imam Abdul Rahman Al Faisal National Guard Hospital 
Imam Abdulrahman Al Faisal National Guard Hospital was inaugurated in 2002 in Dammam. It is placed the hospital at the forefront of hospitals in the eastern region .

King Saud Bin Abdulaziz University for Health Sciences 
The King Saud Bin Abdulaziz University for Health Sciences as formally established in 2005 as a result of the positive feedback from the postgraduate programs in various medical fields being offered by the National Guard Health Affairs since the mid-1980s.
It is now the best University in Saudi Arabia to provide health staff

King Abdullah International Medical Research Center 

The King Abdullah International Medical Research Center is the hub of biomedical and clinical research at MNG-HA.

See also

 List of things named after Saudi Kings

References

External links
 Ministry of National Guard - Health Affairs, The Official website of Ministry of National Guard - Health Affairs
 Conjoined twins, The official Saudi Website of conjoined twins

Hospital networks
Hospitals in Saudi Arabia
Ministry of National Guard
Military hospitals in Saudi Arabia